Dorset County may refer to:

 Dorset, United Kingdom
 the former name of Dorset Land District, Tasmania, Australia